The Belgian Cup is the premier Rugby Union knock-out competition in Belgium and is organised by the Belgian Rugby Federation. The cup has been held annually since the 1967–68 season. Boitsfort RC have won the trophy more times than any other team, with thirteen victories, and also hold the record for the most successive victories, with seven between 2002 and 2008. The winners of the Belgian Cup compete with the Belgian Elite League winners for the Belgian Super Cup

Winners 

 1968: ASUB Waterloo
 1969: Kituro
 1970: Coq Mosan
 1971: Frameries
 1972: Brussels British
 1973: BUC
 1974: Brussels British
 1975: SHAPE
 1976: SHAPE
 1977: Kituro
 1978: Coq Mosan
 1979: ASUB Waterloo
 1980: Coq Mosan
 1981: Kituro
 1982: Brussels British
 1983: Kituro
 1984: ASUB Waterloo
 1985: ASUB Waterloo
 1986: ASUB Waterloo
 1987: ASUB Waterloo
 1988: ASUB Waterloo
 1989: Coq Mosan
 1990: Boitsfort
 1991: ASUB Waterloo
 1992: ASUB Waterloo
 1993: Kituro
 1994: ASUB Waterloo
 1995: Boitsfort
 1996: Boitsfort
 1997: Boitsfort
 1998: Kituro
 1999: Boitsfort
 2000: Visé

Wins by Club

External links 
 Site de la Fédération Belge de Rugby
 Site Belge de Rugby

Rugby union competitions in Belgium
1967 establishments in Belgium